Cuttyhunk Harbor is a bay in Dukes County, Massachusetts. Cuttyhunk Harbor is connected to Vineyard Sound by Canapitsit Channel. Cuttyhunk is an Indian word meaning "cleared land" or "plantation".

References

Bodies of water of Dukes County, Massachusetts
Sounds of Massachusetts